Mojtaba Al-Salem (born 15 June 1994) is a Saudi Arabian handball player for Al-Noor and the Saudi Arabian national team.

References

1994 births
Living people
Saudi Arabian male handball players
Handball players at the 2018 Asian Games
Asian Games competitors for Saudi Arabia
20th-century Saudi Arabian people
21st-century Saudi Arabian people